This is a list of released and upcoming video games that are developed in Belgium. The list is sorted by game title, platform, year of release and their developer. This list does not include serious games.

References

Belgium
Video games developed